Davis Memorial Presbyterian Church is a historic Presbyterian church at 450 Randolph Avenue in Elkins, Randolph County, West Virginia, United States. It was originally built in 1894 and 1895 after designs prepared by the Baltimore architect Charles E. Cassell. In 1921, an Akron plan Sunday School building was added to the north by Clarence L. Harding of Washington D. C. The building consists of a nave, an engaged tower, and a gable roofed structure located perpendicular to the nave. It is built of a granular conglomerate stone consisting of large, transparent quartz crystals bound in clay or silica. The style is Gothic, with Romanesque and eclectic influences.

It was listed on the National Register of Historic Places in 1984.

References

19th-century Presbyterian church buildings in the United States
Buildings and structures in Elkins, West Virginia
Davis and Elkins family
Gothic Revival church buildings in West Virginia
Presbyterian churches in West Virginia
Churches on the National Register of Historic Places in West Virginia
Churches completed in 1894
National Register of Historic Places in Randolph County, West Virginia
U.S. Route 250
1894 establishments in West Virginia